Neodymium(III) vanadate is an inorganic compound, a salt of neodymium and vanadic acid with the chemical formula of NdVO4. It forms pale-blue, hydrated crystals.

Preparation 
Neodymium(III) vanadate is produced by the reaction of hot acidic neodymium(III) chloride and sodium vanadate:

Physical properties 
Neodymium(III) vanadate forms crystals of the tetragonal crystal system, space group I 41/amd, lattice constants a = 0.736 nm, b = 0.736 nm, c = 0.6471 nm, α = 90°, β = 90°, γ = 90°, Z = 4.

It doesn't dissolve in water.

It can form hydrates.

Applications 
Neodymium(III) vanadate can be used for:

 Phosphorus crystallisation.
 Laser material.

References

External reading 

 Новые возможности кристаллов ванадатов с неодимом как активных сред лазеров с диодной накачкой

Neodymium compounds
Vanadates